Vísur Vatnsenda-Rósu (English: "Verses by Rósa of Vatnsendi") is a traditional Icelandic song. The lyrics are a poem written by Rósa Guðmundsdóttir (1795–1855); the melody is a traditional lullaby, arranged by Jón Ásgeirsson (1928–) in 1960.

Lyrics

English translation:

In Popular Culture
The song is most famous for its performance for Hector Zazou's album Chansons des mers froides (Songs from the cold seas) by Icelandic singer Björk; it also appears on Björk's third Possibly Maybe single CD.

It has also been performed by the Swedish artist Nåid, Icelandic singer Ragnheiður Gröndal, and Belgian folk band Griff.

In the film Zack Snyder's Justice League, “Vísur Vatnsenda-Rósu” is sung by a group of Icelandic villagers as Arthur Curry / Aquaman dives into the ocean after meeting Bruce Wayne / Batman. The village, where Batman first meets Aquaman, seems to be reliant on the latter for survival and to have built him up as a quasi-mythical figure.

References

Icelandic songs
Björk songs
Year of song unknown
Songs based on poems